Bairiki National Stadium is located in Bairiki, Kiribati. It is the national stadium and the home of Kiribati's men's and women's national football teams. The official name of the stadium is Reuben K. Uatioa Stadium. The stadium's capacity is around 2,500.

Football
The stadium is the home ground of the Kiribati national football teams. Despite this, it has never been used for an international match, because Kiribati have never played an international football match at home.

The sand surface in the stadium is also a factor that has stopped Kiribati becoming an official FIFA member for the time being.

References

Football venues in Kiribati
Athletics (track and field) venues in Kiribati
South Tarawa
National stadiums